Kodikunnil Suresh (born 4 June 1962) is an Indian politician and working-president of the Kerala Pradesh Congress Committee (KPCC). He was a Minister of State in the Ministry of Labour. He is a member of the seventeenth Lok Sabha representing Mavelikara in Kerala. He has been a member of Lok Sabha seven times. He is also the Secretary of the All India Congress Committee (AICC).

Early life and education
He was born in Kodikunnil, Thiruvananthapuram district to a poor family, as the youngest son of Kunjan and Thankamma.  He did his pre-degree from Mar Ivanios College, Thiruvananthapuram and graduation in LL.B from Government Law College, Thiruvananthapuram.

Political career
He was elected to the Lok Sabha for the first time in 1989 and thereafter in the 1991,1996, 1999 General Elections to the Lok Sabha from Adoor constituency. He was defeated in the 1998, 2004 elections. He served as the member of the Kerala Pradesh Congress Committee and member of AICC.
He won the general election to the Lok Sabha in 2009 defeating R. S. Anil of the Communist Party of India with a margin of 48,048 votes.

In 2014, he won the Lok Sabha elections defeating Chengara Surendran of the Communist Party of India and is the present Member of Parliament from Mavelikkara constituency. He has been selected as working-president of the Kerala Pradesh Congress Committee (KPCC) on 19 September 2018.

Controversies
His victory in the 2009 general election was declared void by the Kerala High Court over the allegation that his caste certificate was fake, and that he was a Christian. This verdict was later reversed by the Supreme Court.

References

Indian National Congress politicians from Kerala
1962 births
Living people
Malayali politicians
Indian Christians
India MPs 2009–2014
Lok Sabha members from Kerala
India MPs 1989–1991
India MPs 1991–1996
India MPs 1996–1997
India MPs 1999–2004
India MPs 2014–2019
People from Thiruvananthapuram district
India MPs 2019–present
Government Law College, Thiruvananthapuram alumni